Jacopo Vignali (September 5, 1592 – August 3, 1664) was an Italian painter of the early Baroque period.

Biography
Vignali was born in Pratovecchio, near Arezzo, and initially trained under Matteo Rosselli. He painted the ceiling fresco of the Love of the Fatherland and Jacob's dream for the Casa Buonarroti in Florence. In 1616 he entered the Accademia del Disegno in Florence. In the 1620s, he painted the Investiture of St Benedict for the Confraternità di San Benedetto Bianco.
In 1622–23 he also contributed to fresco cycles for the Medici at the Casino Mediceo di San Marco in Florence, and at the Villa di Poggio Imperiale. Among his pupils were Domenico Bettini, Romolo Panfi, Alessandro Rosi, and Carlo Dolci.

References

Grove encyclopedia biography on Artnet

1592 births
1664 deaths
People from the Province of Arezzo
16th-century Italian painters
Italian male painters
17th-century Italian painters
Painters from Tuscany
Italian Baroque painters